Jacques Singer (May 9, 1910 – August 11, 1980) was an American virtuoso violinist, symphony orchestra conductor, and music educator who flourished from about 1925 until a few months before his death in 1980.

Career

Education
Jakob Singer was born in Przemyśl, Austria-Hungary (present-day Poland). He trained in the violin from an early age. He began to give concerts in Poland at age seven. In 1920, his family moved to the United States, settling in Jersey City. Before making any sort of official American debut, Singer, as a teenager, had been playing recitals, in one case, at a Columbia University student social gathering at Earl Hall.

In 1923, Singer became a scholarship violin student of Leopold Auer and his associate, Jacob Mestechkin (1880–1953). He made his American debut in New York the evening of February 11, 1925 at Town Hall performing (in solo) Bach's G-minor Fugue; then with pianist , Paganini's D major concerto; then with Schultze and violinist Jacob Mestechkin (his teacher), Christian Sinding's Serenade for two violins and piano.

Singer attended the Curtis Institute of Music on a scholarship in 1926  – in the third year after the institute was founded. While there, he studied with Carl Flesch. Curtis did not issue diplomas during its first ten years. Singer was in The Students' Orchestra for Curtis' 1926–1927 season. Leopold Stokowski was conductor.

Singer began attending the Juilliard School in 1927, studying with Leopold Auer, Paul Kochanski, and Rubin Goldmark. Singer was also a violinist with the Juilliard Graduate School String Orchestra; Albert Stoessel was the conductor. Singer graduated from Juilliard in 1930.

Philadelphia Orchestra
While at Juilliard, Singer became a violinist with the Philadelphia Orchestra at age eighteen, their youngest member at the time. Leopold Stokowski took an interest in him and requested he conduct a contemporary piece at one of the rehearsals in 1935.

From watching Stokowski, he picked up several of the maestro's practices: conducting without baton (or score at times), making instructional comments to an audience, and stopping performances during disturbances. These he employed as conductor of the orchestra's youth orchestra in 1936.

Philadelphia Youth Orchestra 
In 1936, Singer reorganized and began conducting the Philadelphia Youth Orchestra. The orchestra had been founded in 1934 by Stokowski and, before Singer, was conducted by Sylvan Levin.  The orchestra, at that time, was composed of musicians from ages 13 to 25.

Dallas Symphony: 1938–1942
With a recommendation from Stokowski, Singer made his conducting debut with the Dallas Symphony Orchestra on February 1, 1938. He remained with that orchestra until 1942. Audience reaction to his style and personality was positive, the symphony budget doubled, and subscriptions tripled. While there, as reported by Time magazine, Singer became engaged in a feud with critic John ("Rosy") Rosenfield (born Max John Rosenfield Jr.; 1900–1966) of The Dallas Morning News.

Rosenfield lauded Singer early on, but soon turned against him.   Singer became angry enough to print handbills and make speeches defending himself during concert intermissions.

In spring 1951, Rosenfield published an article in the Southwest Review refuting that a feud transpired, or, rather, that Time's depiction of his criticism was, on balance, overblown, considering the critical acclaim on Singer that he published in The Dallas Morning News.

World War II
By the 1942–43 season, most of the Dallas Symphony Orchestra's musicians were enlisted in the armed services.

During World War II Singer served as a private in the U.S. Army. He saw active service and received three battle stars for New Guinea, Bataan, and Corregidor. He conducted army band concerts, including the first concert given after the liberation of Corregidor.

New Orleans Summer Concerts: 1946
In 1946, he conducted 28 concerts in eight weeks for the summer New Orleans Pops Concerts.

Vancouver Symphony: 1947–1951
A guest conducting engagement with the Vancouver Symphony Orchestra led to his appointment as a conductor of that orchestra from 1947 to 1951. Singer, an advocate of contemporary music by established and emerging composers has been chronicled favorably by musicologists for programing works, including a March 1948 performance by the VSO of Walter Piston's Prelude and Fugue for Orchestra, commissioned in 1934 by the League of Composers.

The First Symposium of Canadian Contemporary Music was held in Vancouver March 12–15, 1950, at the Hotel Vancouver and the Denman Auditorium under the sponsorship of the Vancouver Symphony Society and the Community Arts Council of Vancouver. Singer was the initiator and music director of the Symposium. Alec Walton was chairman of the symposium. The event featured four days of performances of works by 33 Canadian composers, including:

 Violet Archer
 Leonard Edwin Basham (pseudonym Robert Lenard Barclay; 1918–1980)
 John Beckwith
 Richard Tom Bevan (1894–1965)
 Howard Cable
 Edwin Alec Collins (born 1893)
 Robert Fleming
 Harry Freedman
 Ernest MacMillan
 Paul Alexander de Marky (1897–1982)
 Oskar Morawetz
 Bernard Naylor (de) (1907–1986)
 Charles O'Neill
 Kenneth Peacock
 Barbara Pentland
 Clermont Pépin
 Godfrey Ridout
 Harry Somers
 Andrew Twa (1919–2009)
 Alfred Whitehead
 Healey Willan

The Symposium concluded with a panel discussion on Canadian music moderated by Alec Walton, a young banker and brother of composer William Walton. The panelist included Singer, Barbara Pentland, Eugène Lapierre, Dorothy Cadzow (1916–2001), Charles O'Neill, Zilba Georgieva (soprano), John Weinzweig, and Harry Adaskin.  Attended by 1,500, the Symposium was the only venture of its kind on record for Canada and stood as the largest festival of Canadian music until Expo '67.

There are differing explations for Singer's departure from the VSO – one being that he resigned from the symphony over a disagreement with the board over the $19,000 budget deficit (the board wanted a shortened season). Another explanation, offered by musicologist Elaine Keillor, was that the VSO fired Singer over circumstances directly linked to his promotion of contemporary music.

Selected performances
American composer David Diamond's Violin Concerto No. 2 was premiered on February 29, 1948, by Dorotha Powers, with Singer conducting the VSO. Difficulties with the estate of Arthur W. Percival, Dorotha Powers' husband, prevented further performances of the work for the next 43 years – until May 6, 1991 – when Gerard Schwarz arranged for its second performance, billed as a U.S. première. Percival commissioned the work for his wife through an arrangement with conductor Artur Rodzinski.

On November 27, 1948, Singer, conducting the VSO, premiered Wallingford Riegger's "Evocation."

British Columbia Philharmonic: 1951
Singer next founded a rival orchestra, the British Columbia Philharmonic. At the first concert, Victoria Symphony Orchestra's conductor Hans Gruber called the orchestra unprepared and the chorus incompetent, referring to a performance of Beethoven's Symphony No. 9.

Broadway: 1951–1952
On Broadway, from December 19, 1951, through April 13, 1952, at the old Ziegfeld Theatre, Singer conducted a production of two Cleopatras, consisting of two plays presented with live music on alternating nights for 133 performances; the first for 67 performances – George Bernard Shaw's Caesar and Cleopatra; and the second for 66 performances – Shakespeare's Antony and Cleopatra. Both plays starred Vivien Leigh and Laurence Olivier. The music was composed by Herbert Menges.  Igor Stravinsky, who reportedly attended on opening night, remarked that the pit orchestra sounded like a symphony.

Israel: 1952
In 1952, Singer guest-conducted the Israel Philharmonic, the Jerusalem Radio Orchestra, and the Haifa Symphony (he). This included the first concert in Nazareth for the Haifa Symphony.

Corpus Christi Symphony Orchestra: 1954–1962
The Corpus Christi Symphony Orchestra was established in 1945 by C. Burdette "Bud" Wolfe (1904–1974), who became its first conductor; Rabbi Sidney Abraham Wolf (1906–1983); and six others. Nine years after its founding, Singer became the conductor, conducting his first concert on October 18, 1954. As a marker for the scope of the CCSO, its 1956–1956 budget was $53,000. Singer served as conductor there from 1954 to 1962.

Guest conducting
On March 25, 1956, Singer guest-conducted the closing season concert of the Indianapolis Symphony Orchestra, to critical acclaim.

On January 26, 1958, Singer guest conducted the Havana Philharmonic Orchestra (ru) (Orquesta Filarmónica de la Habana), performing Paul Csonka's Violin Concerto No. 2.  The  violin soloist, Ángel Reyes, was, at the time, on the faculty at the Northwestern University School of Music.  The orchestra, with Singer conducting, also performed Sibelius' Symphony No. 1 and works by Chausson.

Beginning around April 1958, Singer, as visiting conductor, led the Buenos Aires Philharmonic at the Colon Theater in Argentina. Reviews of a concert on June 22, 1958, by two Buenos Aires newspapers, Democracia and La Prensa lauded Singer's artistic accomplishments (after working two months with the orchestra). One critic referred to Singer as a miracle worker.

In 1961, Singer spent a month with the Venezuela Symphony Orchestra, culminating in 4 concerts, the first on April 29. The concerts received critical acclaim.

Oregon Symphony: 1962–1972
Singer debuted with the Oregon Symphony – then the Portland Symphony Orchestra – as a guest conductor in February 1962. Critics gave Singer favorable reviews. Martin Clark (born Martin Hooper Clark; 1920–1983) of the Oregon Journal, wrote, "Never has the orchestra been more responsive to a baton."

Singer had signed on with Corpus Christi for an additional three years when he was hired as the permanent conductor and music director of the Oregon Symphony in April 1962.  He served there from 1962 to 1972. In his first season (1962–63), the orchestra performed 47 weeks of concerts – the second most by an orchestra of its size in the United States. Singer changed the scope of the orchestra. Specifically, under Singer, the musicians secured full-time contracts, the orchestra began a series of tours throughout the state of Oregon, and in 1967, the name changed from the Portland Symphany Orchestra to the Oregon Symphony Orchestra.

Early in his tenure, Singer requested the concertmaster's violin to demonstrate a passage. Tubaist John Richards (né John Keil Richards; 1918–2011) recounted the incident: "He tucked it under his chin and played four or five bars to show what he wanted. The rest of the string section sat openmouthed at how well he could play."

Singer proved to be a temperamental conductor there as recounted by a violinist in The Oregonian.  In rehearsal one day, Singer told the tubaist John Richards, "I can't hear you". On the next run-through, Richards blasted the note louder. "Still can't hear you", said Singer. The next time, Richards blew the tuba with both lungs. "I still can't hear you", said Singer. Richards was getting angry by now, but Singer chose this moment to tie a white handkerchief onto his baton with which he waved a flag of surrender.

Singer, throughout his career, was an exponent of new music from established and emerging composers, which, in programming, he had to carefully balance, particularly with orchestras whose benefactors and patrons yearned for the classics. Singer, with the Oregon Symphony, performed many contemporary works that won favorable reviews, including a 1969 performance of Paul Creston's tone poem, Corinthians XIII, Op. 82, composed in 1963.

Singer ultimately left the orchestra he had built, over a controversy that divided the organization. His attempt to bring in a new concertmaster led to a stand-off between the union and the artistic freedom of a conductor. The concertmaster that Singer wanted replaced – Hugh Winchester Ewart (1924–2017), who had held the position since 1950 – was, in 1973, pressured to surrender his chair, and he declined a demotion offer to become associate concertmaster. Soon thereafter, still in 1973, a new concertmaster, Michael Foxman, was appointed. The upshot of Singer's exit related to disagreements over artistic freedom and a rift with the some of the musicians. Singer believed in artistry over rules and regulations. Quality, reportedly, ruled his artistic domain. His contract with the Oregon Symphony extended through April 1973, though he did not conduct during the 1972–73 season.

Selected performances

Guest conducting
On September 24, 1962, before starting as Artistic Director of the Oregon Symphony, Singer made his London debut conducting the London Philharmonic at Royal Festival Hall, which included guest pianist Rudolf Firkušný.  The performance won Singer and Firkušný eight curtain calls and a music critic from London's Daily Telegraph declared it a "personal triumph" for Singer.

On December 8, 1964, Singer flew from Portland to New York to conduct members of American Symphony Orchestra at Lincoln Center's Philharmic Hall in a program that featured violinist Ruggiero Ricci performing his third of four concerts in a span of 30 days under a different conductor each time, showcasing great masterpieces of violin concerto repertoire – 15 concertos in all:

Ricci, November 8 and 9, 1965, reunited with Singer in Portland, with the Oregon Symphony, and performed the Paganini, Stravinsky, and Brahms concertos.

On April 17, 1970, Singer debuted with the Royal Philharmonic Orchestra at Royal Festival Hall as guest conductor of a program that included a London debut of a piano concerto by Richard Yardumian, performed by Jeffrey Siegel.

On January 11, 1972, Singer conducted the Honolulu Symphony featuring pianist John Browning. In early June 1972, Singer conducted the Orchestre de la Suisse Romande in Geneva, to critical acclaim, featuring works of Beethoven, Prokofiev, and Rachmaninoff (Rhapsody on a Theme of Paganini, Giuseppe La Licata at the piano). The concert was broadcast countrywide.

On June 18, 1972, and again on January 18 & 21, 1973, he guest-conducted the Venezuela Symphony Orchestra. The June 18 concert included the Venezuela premier of Shostakovich's Symphony No. 12.

Naumburg Summer Concerts in Central Park: 1974–1979
Singer moved to New York. During that time, part-time and only seasonally, he conducted the Naumburg Orchestra for six summer seasons (1974–79) in Central Park at the Naumburg Band Shell, adjacent to Fifth Avenue and 72nd Street.

The Naumburg concert series, supported by the Walter W. Naumburg Foundation, during Singer's years, corresponded to seasons 69 through 74 – Elkan Naumburg founded the series in 1905. The Naumburg Band Shell, currently (as of ), has endured for  years.

Programs

Northern Illinois University: 1977–1980
Singer became an artist in residence at Northern Illinois University, and from 1977 until shortly before his death in 1980, he conducted the Northern Illinois University Philharmonic.  Singer's wife, Leslie, an accomplished pianist, left the Juilliard staff 1978 to take over the piano classes of Reynolds Whitney (1919–1978), a member of the NIU music faculty since 1948 who died January 2, 1978.

Guest conducting
In 1974, Jacques Singer guest-conducted the Cosmopolitan Symphony, a New York City youth orchestra founded in 1963. He enjoyed encouraging young artists, and delighted in guest conducting rehearsals or concerts of the New York conservatories, which included those of Juilliard and the Manhattan School of Music, as well as high school musicians, which included his daughter Lori.

Death
Jacques Singer died August 11, 1980, at his home in Manhattan, New York, aged 70.

Family
Jakob Singer was one of three children born to Meyer Singer (aka Mark Eli Singer; 1877–1922) and Rachella Bach (1881–1937).  Meyer, Rachella (later known as "Rose" or "Rosie"), and their three children immigrated to the United States, sailing from Bremen on October 21, 1920, aboard the USS Susquehanna, and arriving in the Port of New York November 4, 1920. According to the ship's manifest, their nearest relative, Elias Singer (Jakob's grandfather), was residing in Jersey City. The manifest listed Meyer Singer's occupation as "chanter".

Sometime after the death of Meyer Singer in 1922, Jakob, his mother, and his younger sister, Bronja, lived with Jacques' uncle and aunt, Solomon Singer (1892–1970) and Ruth Singer (1905–1968) along with Solomon and Ruth's son, Nobert Dave Singer (born 1929) and a cousin, Emanuel B. Bach (born around 1900). Their address in 1930 was 283 York Street, Jersey City, across the street from Van Vorst Park.

Jacques Singer became a naturalized citizen sometime between 1920 and 1930 in Philadelphia.

On January 28, 1946, in New York City Jacques married Leslie Wright (born 1924), a Texas piano virtuoso and pedagogue who, in the early 1940s, studied at the University of North Texas College of Music with Silvio Scionti and in the latter 1940s, in New York with Sidney Foster (né Sidney Earl Finkelstein; 1917–1977).

Foster was a friend of Jacques who, on October 29, 1939, married Jacques' sister, Bessie (née Bronja Singer; 1916–2016), also a pianist and later longtime music professor at Indiana University Bloomington's Jacobs School of Music. Sidney Foster and Bronja Singer both graduated from the Curtis Institute of Music on May 17, 1938, with Diplomas in Piano.

Jacques and Leslie had four children: Claude, Marc, Lori, and Gregory. Lori and Gregory are twins. Marc and Lori are actors. Claude is a brand strategist in New York City. Gregory, a Juilliard graduate, is a prolific violinist, conductor, and pedagogue, is the music director of the Manhattan Symphonie, which he founded in 2005.

Jacques Singer's nephew once removed, Bryan, is a prolific film producer/director. He was adopted and raised by Nobert Dave Singer (born 1929) and Grace L. Sinden (née Weinstein; born 1933), who were married to each other between 1954 and 1977. Nobert's father, Solomon Singer (1892–1970) (Jacques' uncle), was a concert violinist, conductor, and violin teacher. Jacques and Leslie had a fifth child, a son, who died at birth in Dallas, April 1, 1950.

Awards
 1959: Gold Medal, Buenos Aires Philharmonic

Discography and extant recordings 
Very few recordings of Singer exist.  Some extant tapes, however, are archived in various music libraries of institutions where Singer conducted.

Notes and references

Notes

General references: books

 Symphony Conductors of the U.S.A. by Hope Stoddard (1900–1987), New York: Thomas Y. Crowell (1957), p. 375; 
 Living Musicians, 1st supplement, compiled by David Ewen (1897–1985), H.W. Wilson Co. (1957), p. 144;

General references: articles 

 "Role of Music in Israel", interview with Jacques Singer, The Etude, Vol. 72, No. 7, July 1954, pp. 13 & 61 (accessible via )
 Portland Symphony Program, February 28, 1966; 
 "Symphony Conductor Singer Fired", The Oregon Journal, December 17, 1971, p. 1
 Social Security Death Index (as a reference for DOB)

Books, magazines, journals, dissertations, and websites

Newspapers 

1910 births
1980 deaths
American male conductors (music)
American people of Polish-Jewish descent
Polish emigrants to the United States
Jewish American musicians
Juilliard School alumni
Texas classical music
Musicians from Oregon
Curtis Institute of Music alumni
Oregon Symphony
20th-century American conductors (music)
20th-century male musicians